Leonardo Pereira may refer to:

 Léo Pereira (footballer, born 1996), Brazilian football centre-back
 Léo Pereira (footballer, born 2000), Brazilian football winger

See also
 Léo Ceará (born 1995), full name Leonardo de Sousa Pereira, Brazilian football forward